Baharo Phool Barsao, is a 1972 Pakistani Urdu-language romance film produced and directed by Indian director Mehmood Sadiq (a.k.a. M. Sadiq). He had come from India to produce and direct this film, but died halfway through its production. It was completed by the Pakistani film director Hassan Tariq.

It cast Waheed Murad, Rani, Rukhsana, Munawar Zarif, Saiqa, Kamal Irani, Tamanna, Ilyas Kashmiri, Aslam Pervaiz and Sangeeta (as guest star). The film is based on India's Lucknow culture.

Summary 
Nawab Parvez Akhter (Waheed Murad) spends a lot of money on his wedding and his newly wedded wife (Rani), plunging himself into huge debt, also his rival Nawab Fakhru (Aslam Pervaiz) plots against him.

Cast 
 Rani as Salma
 Waheed Murad as Nawab Parvez Akhter
 Rukhsana
 Aslam Pervaiz as Nawab Fakhru
 Ilyas Kashmiri as Shabbo Pehalwaan
 Saiqa as Yasmeen
 Kamal Irani
 Munawar Zarif as Mirza
 Sangeeta (Special appearance)

Reception 
Film was released by Sadiq Productions on 11 August 1972 in Pakistani cinemas. The film completed 23 weeks on main cinema and 64 weeks on other cinemas of Karachi and thus became a blockbuster Golden Jubilee film of the year. The film was again released in 1983, after Waheed Murad's death, in Lahore's cinemas and it again celebrated Golden Jubilee in its second run.

Music 
The music of the film is composed by Nashad and the songs are written by Shewan Rizvi. Playback singers are Masood Rana, Noor Jehan, Ahmad Rushdi, Mala, Tassawar Khanum, Irene Perveen, and Shaukat Ali. The songs of the film became very popular esp. Mere dil ki hai awaz..., Yeh ghar mera gulshan hai... and Chanda re chanda.... A list of the songs of the film is as follows:
 Mere dil ki hai awaz... by Masood Rana
 Yeh ghar mera gulshan hai... by Noor Jehan
 Chanda re chanda... by Noor Jehan
 Aye mohabbat tera jawab nahin... by Shaukat Ali, Irene Perveen and Tassawar Khanum
 Aye parda-nasheen... by Tassawar Khanum and Mala
 Meri jaan yaar badsha... by Ahmed Rushdi and Tassawar Khanum

Awards 
Film Baharo Phool Barsao won 4 Nigar Awards in the following categories:

References 

1972 films
Films scored by Nashad
Pakistani romance films
1970s Urdu-language films
Nigar Award winners
Culture of Lucknow
Films directed by M. Sadiq